Bondi Ink Tattoo, also known as Bondi Ink Tattoo Crew, is an Australian factual television series on Eleven which follows events which take place in a tattoo shop on Bondi Beach. The show premiered on Australia's Network Ten on 28 July 2015.

Cast

Current
 Megan Massacre (season 1 - present)
 Teneile Napoli (season 1 - present)
 John Tadrosse (season 1 - present)
 Shaun Bones (season 1 - present)
 Jimi May (season 1 - present)
 Van Peters (season 2 - present)
 Ellie Thompson (season 1 - present)
 Jesska Cristalball (season 2 - present)
 Wendy Tadrosse (season 1 - present)

Past
 Mike Diamond (Season 1)
 Giorgia Mae (season 1)
 Moses Savea (season 1)

Guest artist appearances
 Rhys Gordon (season 1)
 Bennett Neil (season 1)
 Karlee Sabrina (season 2)
 Lauren Winzer (season 2)

Episodes

Broadcast
Bondi Ink Tattoo Crew has enjoyed considerable success outside Australia and has been sold and broadcast in Africa (SonyMax), Ireland (TV3), UK (TruTV), UK Scuzz, New Zealand (TVNZ), USA (Fuse) and Latin America (TruTV).

Bondi Ink Tattoo Crew is broadcast in Australia on ELEVEN, one of Network Ten's two digital channels.

See also

 List of tattoo TV shows
 List of Australian television series

References

External links
 
 
 Bondi Ink Tattoo Studio

2010s Australian reality television series
Australian factual television series
2015 Australian television series debuts
2017 Australian television series endings
Australian television spin-offs
Television shows set in Sydney
English-language television shows
10 Peach original programming
Reality television spin-offs
Television series set in tattoo shops
Bondi, New South Wales